SEH or Seh may refer to:

Science and technology
 Lipid-phosphate phosphatase, an enzyme
 Soluble epoxide hydrolase, an enzyme which catalyzes the addition of water to epoxides
 Spinal extradural haematoma
 Structured Exception Handling, a computing concept designed to handle the occurrence of program exceptions

Transportation
 Shoreham railway station, Kent, England (National Rail station code SEH)
 Sky Express (Greece) (ICAO airline code SEH)
 South German Railway Museum, (German: Süddeutsches Eisenbahnmuseum Heilbronn), Germany
 Senggeh Airport (IATA airport code), Indonesia; see List of airports by IATA code

Other uses
 St Edmund Hall, Oxford, England
 Shin-Etsu Handotai, a semiconductor wafer manufacturer for the integrated circuit industry; see Soitec
 Seh, a village in Iran